The 1995 Cardiff Council election was the first election to the new unitary County Council of the City and County of Cardiff following the re-organization of local government in Wales. It was held on Thursday 4 May 1995. It was followed by the 1999 elections. On the same day there were elections to  the other 21 local authorities in Wales and community councils in Wales. Labour won a majority of the seats. It was preceded in Cardiff by the 1991 elections to Cardiff City Council and the 1993 elections to South Glamorgan County Council.

Overview
All council seats were up for election. These were the first elections held following local government reorganisation, which created new 'super authorities' and would lead to the abolition of South Glamorgan County Council on 1 April 1996. Cardiff councillors would act in a shadow capacity to the new Cardiff Council, until the following April.

The ward boundaries for the new authority were based on the previous Cardiff City Council. In addition, the Creigiau ward which was previously within Taff Ely Borough Council was included within the new authority.

Candidates
All 67 seats were contested by the Labour Party and the Liberal Democrats, whilst the Conservative Party contested 58, and Plaid Cymru contested 28. The majority of the sitting members on the two previous authorities stood for election. 

Members of the Cardiff City Council prior to the election are denoted with *

Members of South Glamorgan County Council prior to the election are denoted with +

Outcome
Labour won an overwhelming majority, including wards that had been held on predecessor councils by the Conservatives for many years. A number of long-serving Conservative councillors failed to be elected. The Liberal Democrats captured wards where they had been successful in the past but the party also lost some ground. Plaid Cymru had their first Cardiff councillor elected for 27 years, in the Creigiau ward.

|}

Ward Results

Adamsdown (two seats)

Former city mayor, Bill Herbert, was rejected as Labour's candidate in favour of South Glamorgan councillor and county highways chairman, Ken Hutchings. Herbert stood as an Independent.

Butetown (1 seat)

Caerau (2 seats)

Canton (3 seats)

Cathays (3 seats)

Creigiau (1 seat)

Cyncoed (3 seats)

Ely (3 seats)

Fairwater (3 seats)

Gabalfa (1 seat)

Grangetown (3 seats)

Heath (3 seats)

Lisvane and St Mellons (1 seat)

Llandaff (2 seats)

Llandaff North (2 seats)

Llanishen (3 seats)

Llanrumney (3 seats)

Pentwyn (3 seats)

Pentyrch (1 seat)

Plasnewydd (4 seats)

Radyr & St Fagans (1 seat)

Rhiwbina (3 seats)

Riverside (3 seats)

Roath (3 seats)

Rumney (2 seats)

Splott (2 seats)

Trowbridge (2 seats)

Whitchurch & Tongwynlais (4 seats)

By-elections between 1995 and 1999

Fairwater

Plasnewydd

The by-election was called following the election of Cllr. Julie Morgan as the Member for the Parliamentary constituency of Cardiff North.

Rhiwbina

References

1995
1995 Welsh local elections
1990s in Cardiff